Dan Ariely (born April 29, 1967) is an Israeli-American professor and author. He serves as a James B. Duke Professor of psychology and behavioral economics at Duke University. Ariely is the founder of the research institution The Center for Advanced Hindsight, as well as the co-founder of several companies implementing insights from behavioral science. Ariely's TED talks have been viewed over 15 million times. Ariely wrote an advice column called Ask Ariely in the WSJ for over ten years; he stepped away from the column at the end of 2022. Ariely is the author of the three New York Times best sellers Predictably Irrational, The Upside of Irrationality, and The Honest Truth about Dishonesty, as well as the books Dollars and Sense, Irrationally Yours – a collection of his The Wall Street Journal advice column Ask Ariely; and Payoff, a short TED book. Ariely appeared in several documentary films, including The Inventor: Out for Blood in Silicon Valley and produced and participated in (Dis)Honesty: The Truth About Lies.

Early life and family
Dan Ariely was born to Yoram and Dafna Ariely in New York City while his father was studying for an MBA degree at Columbia University. He has two sisters. The family emigrated to Israel when he was three. He grew up in Ramat Hasharon and attended Makif Hasharon High School. 

In his senior year of high school, Ariely was active in Hanoar Haoved Vehalomed, an Israeli youth movement. In his writings entitled "Painful Lessons," Ariely described his hospitalization and treatments, detailing how that experience led to his research on "how to better deliver painful and unavoidable treatments to patients."

Ariely married Sumedha (Sumi) Gupta in 1998. They have two children.

Education and academic career
Ariely was a physics and mathematics major at Tel Aviv University but transferred to philosophy and psychology. However, in his last year he dropped philosophy and concentrated solely on psychology, graduating in 1991. In 1994 he earned a masters in cognitive psychology, and in 1996 he earned a Ph.D. in cognitive psychology from the University of North Carolina at Chapel Hill. Ariely completed a second Ph.D. in Business Administration at Duke University in 1998, at the urging of Daniel Kahneman, winner of the Nobel Memorial Prize in Economic Sciences.
 
Ariely taught at MIT between 1998 and 2008, where he was formerly the Alfred P. Sloan Professor of Behavioral Economics at MIT Sloan School of Management and at the MIT Media Lab.

In 2008, Ariely returned to Duke University as James B. Duke Professor of Psychology and Behavioral Economics. Ariely's laboratory at Duke University, the Center for Advanced Hindsight, pursues research in subjects like the psychology of money, decision making by physicians and patients, cheating, and social justice.

Business activities 
In 2010, Ariely co-founded BEworks, a management consulting firm dedicated to applying behavioral science to business and policy challenges. BEworks was acquired by kyu Collective in January 2017. In 2012, he co-founded, with Yuval Shoham and Jacob Bank, Timeful, a technology company aiming to help people manage their time. Timeful was acquired by Google in 2015. In 2013, he co-founded, with Doron Marco and Ayelet Carasso, Genie, a kitchen appliance designed to cook personalized healthy dishes in about a minute.
 
In 2015, Ariely was named chief behavioral economist for Qapital. Ariely, who has also invested in the company, uses his access to the app's platform and database to assist him in independent research on consumer saving and spending behavior. In turn, Qapital can access Ariely's research to test technologies and ideas for use in the app. In 2016, Ariely was named Chief Behavioral Officer for Lemonade, an insurance company, to integrate aspects of behavioral economics into Lemonade's insurance model and help them align incentives between the insurer and insured.

In 2017, he co-founded, with Nati Lavi, Shapa, a health monitoring and encouraging company. In 2018, he co-founded the company Kayma, which uses behavioral economics and original research methods. The company works on projects for the Israeli government's Ministry of Finance.

Accusations of data fraud and academic misconduct 
In 2010, Ariely told NPR in an interview that data from Delta Dental, an insurance provider, showed that dentists frequently (with a probability of "about 50 percent") misdiagnosed cavities when analyzing X-rays, and speculated that this might happen so that dentists could charge more money. A Delta Dental spokesperson later stated that they do not collect data that could support such a conclusion.

In July 2021, the journal Psychological Science issued an Expression of Concern regarding a 2004 paper by James Heyman and Dan Ariely, "prompted by some uncertainty regarding the values of statistical tests reported in the article and the analytic approach taken to the data". The authors were unable to resolve the ambiguities because the original participant-level data was no longer available. A follow up analysis, and a letter to the editor by Gregory Francis from the Department of Psychological Sciences, Purdue University demonstrated that the problem in the paper could be a simple reporting error in which t-statistics were reported as F-statistics by mistake. Francis also showed that this error does not negate the findings in the original article.

In August 2021, data from a field study in a 2012 PNAS paper by Lisa L. Shu, Nina Mazar, Francesca Gino, Dan Ariely, and Max H. Bazerman was reanalyzed on the blog Data Colada. The blog post claimed that the study data was fabricated. All of the 2012 study's authors agreed with this assessment and the paper was retracted. The study's authors also agreed that Dan Ariely was the only author to have had access to the data prior to transmitting it in its fraudulent form to Nina Mazar, the analyst. Dan Ariely denied manipulating the data prior to forwarding it on to Mazar but Excel metadata showed that he created the spreadsheet and was the last to edit it. He also admitted to having mislabeled all of the values in an entire column of the data in e-mail communication with Mazar that took place shortly after he initially sent her the data. Dan Ariely has claimed that someone at the insurance agency that provided the data must have fabricated it.  

Allegations were made regarding Ariely, while was at MIT, running an experiment involving electrical shock without prior required ethics approval, regarding the value of placebos (Commercial Features of Placebo and Therapeutic Efficacy). One of the participants complained, and MIT's Institutional Review Board (IRB) only granted a human experiment approval (with modifications) after the experiment was concluded. The ethics committee decided to forbid Ariely to run experiments for a year, after which he moved to Duke University. Ariely confirmed that he was suspended from collecting data and said it was a misunderstanding between him and the IRB.

In November 2022, a TV investigation show Hamakor (Channel 13) aired an episode questioning a number of Ariely's studies that were not reproducible or that there are significant doubts about their reliability - the way they were carried out, the data collected or in general the very fact that they were carried out. For example, Ariely claimed that data for his "Ten Commandments" study (Amir, Mazar, and Ariely, 2008) was collected at UCLA with the assistance of Professor Aimee Drolet. However, Drolet denies that she ran the study as the authors described.

Books
Ariely is the author of the books Dollars and Sense: How We Misthink Money and How to Spend Smarter, Predictably Irrational: The Hidden Forces That Shape Our Decisions, The Upside of Irrationality: The Unexpected Benefits of Defying Logic at Work and at Home and The Honest Truth About Dishonesty: How We Lie to Everyone – Especially Ourselves.

He explains the impetus for his first book:   When asked whether reading Predictably Irrational and understanding one's irrational behaviors could make a person's life worse (such as by defeating the benefits of a placebo), Ariely responded that there could be a short-term cost, but that there would also likely be long-term benefits, and that reading his book would not make a person worse off.

Asked to describe The Upside of Irrationality, Ariely says, 

In 2008 Ariely, along with his co-authors, Rebecca Waber, Ziv Carmon and Baba Shiv, was awarded an Ig Nobel Prize in medicine for their research demonstrating that "high-priced fake medicine is more effective than low-priced fake medicine."

Works

Books
 
  Second edition in 2012
 
 
 Irrationally Yours. Publisher Harper Collins
 
Amazing Decisions: The Illustrated Guide to Improving Business Deals and Family Meals (illustrated by Matt R. Trower), Hill & Wang, 2019, p. 224,

Articles

Audio and video appearances
 How equal do we want the world to be? You'd be surprised (TED2015)
 Are we in control of our own decisions? (EG 2008)
 Our buggy moral code (TED2009)
 Beware conflicts of interest (TED2011)
 What makes us feel good about our work? (TEDxRiodelaPlata 2012)
 (Dis)Honesty: The Truth About Lies
 The Inventor: Out for Blood in Silicon Valley

See also

 Cognitive bias
 Procrastination

References

External links
 
 
  
 
 BEworks.com

1967 births
Living people
Jewish American economists
Economists from New York (state)
Behavioral economists
Israeli economists
Israeli Jews
Fuqua School of Business alumni
Duke University faculty
MIT Sloan School of Management faculty
Tel Aviv University alumni
University of North Carolina at Chapel Hill alumni
Positive psychologists
MIT Media Lab people
21st-century American economists
21st-century American Jews